Queen of the Sea may refer to:

Transport
 cruise ship nickname
 ocean liner nickname
 Queen of the Sea (ship) a tall ship
 2004 Sri Lanka tsunami train wreck, a wreck caused by the 2004 Boxing Day tsunami of the train service Queen of the Sea Line
 Samudra Devi (Sinhala: සමුද්‍ර දේවී ; literally Queen of the Oceans), daily train service in Sri Lanka
 Merchants and Miners Transportation Company ships

Film
 Queen of the Sea (film) 1918 U.S. fantasy film
 Queen of the Seas (1968 film) Italian adventure film

See also
 Queen of the Ocean (disambiguation)